Mont-Valin is an unorganized territory in the Canadian province of Quebec. It makes up over 87% of Le Fjord-du-Saguenay Regional County Municipality and is the largest subdivision of the Saguenay–Lac-Saint-Jean region. The territory, named after Mount Valin, had a population of 10 as of the Canada 2021 Census, and covered a land area of 33,540.39 km2.

It was founded in 1941, when Alcan built a dam on the Peribonka River. When operation of the dam was automated in 1974, the community was almost entirely abandoned.

The Mont-Valin unorganized territory is a strip of land that stretches from Saguenay River bank to the north. It is bordered to the west by the Rivière Péribonka and to the east by the limit of Côte-Nord administrative region.

Demographics
Population trend:
 Population in 2021: 10 (2016 to 2021 population change: N/A)
 Population in 2016: 0 
 Population in 2011: 5 
 Population in 2006: 15
 Population in 2001: 20
 Population in 1996: 2
 Population in 1991: 5

Private dwellings occupied by usual residents: 5 (total dwellings: 44)

See also
Saint-Martin Dam

References

External links

Unorganized territories in Saguenay–Lac-Saint-Jean